The fifteenth season of the American talent show competition series America's Got Talent was broadcast on NBC from May 26 to September 23, 2020. Following the previous season, both Julianne Hough and Gabrielle Union left the program, leading to both being replaced prior to filming. Heidi Klum was brought back to resume her former role, while Sofía Vergara was hired to join her as a new judge on the judging panel. Simon Cowell missed the live shows, after sustaining an injury in August. While the first two quarter-finals featured guest judges in his place, the remainder of the live episodes were conducted without any further stand-ins.

The fifteenth season was impacted by the COVID-19 pandemic that hit the United States in 2020, which affected arrangements for pre-recorded and live episodes. While most audition episodes had been filmed by the end of April (despite minor issues), remaining episodes were disrupted, but resumed after safety measures were implemented to prevent the risk of the infection spreading among staff and participants. Format changes included the use of a virtual audience for the live rounds, an alteration in the program's broadcast schedule for that year, and a revamp to the format for the Judge Cuts round that would condense it into a single episode while featuring no guest judges as in previous seasons. 

The fifteenth season was won by spoken word poet Brandon Leake, with singing guitarists duo Broken Roots finishing second, and singer Cristina Rae placing third. During its broadcast, the season averaged around 6.61 million viewers.

Season overview 

Open auditions were held in late 2019, with closed auditions held across January to March the following year. Prior to the main auditions taking place, replacements were made for Julianne Hough and Gabrielle Union, who had been let go following the conclusion of the previous season. On February 27, 2020, it was announced that Heidi Klum would return as judge, in addition to newcomer Sofía Vergara.

The season was impacted as a result of the COVID-19 pandemic, which affected television and film shoots across the globe. Although it had been partially disrupted by Klum falling ill, leading to Eric Stonestreet standing in for her during an audition session, restrictions imposed by the United States to combat the spread of COVID-19 caused the program to initially move to filming without an audience present at auditions (before production was ultimately suspended). Additional auditions were later allowed, but these had to be conducted online as a safety precaution. By April 27, the season would broadcast as planned and premiere on May 26, with the season featuring a hiatus after the audition episodes had been aired with the footage that had already been filmed.

In mid-June, production of the season resumed following changes in guidelines for media production by Californian state government, and discussions between industry unions, producers and local officials. While the Judges Cuts stage was held at an outdoor venue in Simi Valley, California, it required implementing several health and safety protocols including: performances conducted via videoconferencing on a cinema screen, masks being mandatory for all personnel when off-camera, enforced social distancing and regular testing of staff. The format was also changed with the number of participants for this stage reduced from seventy-two to sixty. No guest judges or Golden Buzzers were involved, and each participant were given a verdict after their performance. Cowell notably approved the change in format, including the decision to condense all footage taken into a single episode, having disliked the arrangement used in previous seasons.

By the end of July, a decision on how to produce the live round episodes was reached to include a virtual audience for these rounds. Applications were made available within the week of July 28, in order to maintain safe working conditions, with Universal Studios Hollywood chosen as the venue for performances to take place within. This included an expansion in the number of quarter-finalists for the season, an additional quarter-final, and a change to the number of semi-finalists that each quarter-final had. Prior to the first quarter-final's live broadcast, Cowell had an accident that left him with a severe back injury. After undergoing surgery to help repair the damage, he stepped-down from the live episodes until doctors approved his return. Guest judges appeared during Cowell's absence for the first two quarter-finals, before deciding to have the remaining live episodes stick to using a judging panel of three.

Of the participants who auditioned for this season, forty-four secured a place in the live quarter-finals, with eleven quarter-finalists in each one. Among these included: singer Roberta Battaglia, choir Voices of our City Choir, spoken word poet Brandon Leake and singer Cristina Rae and dance group W.A.F.F.L.E. Crew, who had each received a Golden Buzzer from the main judges and host. About twenty-two quarter-finalists advanced and were split between the two semi-finals, with ten semi-finalists securing a place in the finals. The following below lists the results of each participant's overall performance in this season:

 |  |  |  | 
 |  Wildcard Semi-finalist |  Golden Buzzer Audition

  Ages denoted for a participant(s), pertain to their final performance for this season.
  This act initially failed to pass through the Judge Cuts stage, but was later brought back for the quarter-finals after a quarter-finalist was forced to drop out.
  This participant initially pulled out from the contest for health reasons before the quarter-finals, but later returned as a Wildcard act for the semi-finals after being given the all clear by producers.

Quarter-finals summary
 Buzzed Out |  Judges' choice | 
 |  |

Quarter-final 1 (August 11) 
Guest Performers, Results Show: Mat Franco and Kodi Lee

  Kelly Clarkson filled in for Simon Cowell while he recovered from a back injury sustained prior to August 11.

Quarter-final 2 (August 18) 
Guest Performers, Results Show: Darci Lynne and Jabbawockeez

  Kenan Thompson filled in for Simon Cowell while he continued to recover from a back injury sustained prior to August 11.

Quarter-final 3 (August 25) 
Guest Performer, Results Show: Jon Dorenbos

  Dance Town Family were later brought back as a Wildcard act for the Semi-finals.

Quarter-final 4 (September 1) 
Guest Performers, Results Show: Cam and Duo Transcend

Semi-finals summary
 Buzzed Out |  Judges' choice | 
 |  |

Semi-final 1 (September 8) 
Guest Performers, Results Show: Piff the Magic Dragon, David Copperfield, and Ndlovu Youth Choir

Semi-final 2 (September 15) 
Guest Performers, Results Show: BTS and Colin Cloud

  Due to the majority vote for BAD Salsa, Klum's voting intention was not revealed.

Finals (September 22–23)
Guest Performers, Finale: David Dobrik, Detroit Youth Choir, Meghan Markle, and Usher

 |  |  | 

  Alan Silva and Bello Sisters conducted a joint routine for their second performance, and thus shared the same guest performers.
  Kenadi Dodds and Roberta Battaglia conducted a joint routine for their second performance, and thus shared the same guest performers.

Ratings

References

2020 American television seasons
America's Got Talent seasons
Television series impacted by the COVID-19 pandemic